Joe Bush (born c. 1941) is an organ grinder based in Cherry Hill, New Jersey.

Bush began his organ-grinding career in 1975.  According to the Los Angeles Times, "Bush tied himself to his monkey every night for three weeks. His wife would say goodnight and shut him in the family room and turn up the volume on the television."

He performs with a capuchin monkey named Oscar.

References 
 
 

American street performers
Living people
Year of birth missing (living people)